Clinostemon is a genus of flowering plants in the laurel family (Lauraceae). Plants of the genus are native to northern Brazil, Guyana, Peru, and Venezuela.

Two species are recognized:
 Clinostemon maguireanus (C.K.Allen) H.Kurz
 Clinostemon mahuba (A.Samp.) Kuhlm. & Samp.

References

Lauraceae genera
Flora of northern South America
Flora of Brazil
Lauraceae